Karamoullides is a village in the Paphos District of Cyprus, located  south of Polis. Before 1974, it was a Turkish Cypriot village with 103 inhabitants in 1973. The inhabitants were relocated to Katokopia and Nikitas and were replaced partially by displaced Greek Cypriots from the north.

References

Communities in Paphos District